The Benjamin Rowe House is a historic house museum at 88 Belknap Mountain Road in Gilford, New Hampshire. Probably built in the 1830s, it is one of the town's best-preserved period houses. The house was listed on the National Register of Historic Places in 2008, and the New Hampshire State Register of Historic Places in 2003.

Description and history
The Benjamin Rowe House stands at the southern edge of Gilford's town center, on the east side of Belknap Mountain Road. It is located within a loop of the access road for the Gilford Elementary School, and is oriented with its main facade to the south and a side gable to the street. It is a single-story Cape style house built of brick, with a wood-frame ell to the rear. It is five bays wide and four deep, with a central entrance flanked by sidelight windows and topped by a granite lintel. Four slender chimneys pierce the brick roof. A wood-frame ell extends to the north, and a hip-roof porch with bracketed posts is on the street side. The interior retains original 19th-century woodwork and hardware, including fireplace surrounds, doors, and door latches.

The house was probably built in the 1830s, and remains one of the town's best-preserved 19th-century Cape style houses. It underwent a number of alterations, particularly in the early 20th century when the property was in active use as a dairy farm, but these were removed when the building underwent a comprehensive restoration to its original 19th-century appearance in the 1990s. The town purchased the farm in 1970, and briefly housed town offices in the house during the 1980s. It now houses a local history museum.

See also
National Register of Historic Places listings in Belknap County, New Hampshire

References

Houses on the National Register of Historic Places in New Hampshire
Federal architecture in New Hampshire
Greek Revival houses in New Hampshire
Houses completed in 1835
Houses in Belknap County, New Hampshire
Museums in Belknap County, New Hampshire
Historic house museums in New Hampshire
National Register of Historic Places in Belknap County, New Hampshire
New Hampshire State Register of Historic Places
Gilford, New Hampshire